Edward Pocock may refer to:

 Edward Pococke (1604–1691), English Orientalist and biblical scholar
 Edward Innes Pocock (1855–1905), Scottish rugby union player
 Ted Pocock (Edward Robert Pocock, 1934–2013), Australian public servant and diplomat